Weather Wizard (Mark Mardon) is a supervillain appearing in comic books published by DC Comics.

Weather Wizard made his first live-action appearance in the television specials Legends of the Superheroes, played by Jeff Altman. The character latter appeared in the television series The Flash, played by actor Liam McIntyre, who played Mark Mardon. He appeared in the first, second and fifth season of the series. Clyde Mardon appeared in the pilot episode of The Flash, played by actor Chad Rook. In the fifth and sixth seasons, a female version called the Weather Witch is played by Reina Hardesty and is the estranged daughter of Mark Mardon.

Publication history
Created by John Broome and Carmine Infantino, the character made his first appearance in The Flash #110 (December 1959).

Fictional character biography

Early life
Escaping a prison transport by leaping from the window, Mark Mardon fled to his brother's house only to find him dead. Mardon's brother, Clyde, a scientist, had just discovered a way to control the weather before dying of a heart attack (although recent evidence implies that Mardon murdered his brother and either lied about or blocked out the memory of finding his body). Mardon took Clyde's notes and used them to make a wand to generate weather and embarked on a criminal career as the Weather Wizard, sometimes using his powers on a small scale (such as zapping someone with lightning) and sometimes a larger scale (imprisoning a town in winter), almost always facing defeat by the Flash (Barry Allen).

After Barry Allen's death during the Crisis on Infinite Earths, the Weather Wizard went into semi-retirement for a while, until, during Underworld Unleashed, he teamed up with other Rogues which included Captain Cold, Heat Wave, Captain Boomerang, and Mirror Master, as part of a ploy for greater power. Ultimately, it ended with their deaths and the release of the demon Neron. They were later resurrected as soulless demons by Neron to use against Barry Allen's successor Wally West, who manipulated Neron to return the Rogues' souls. The Weather Wizard and the others, except for Heat Wave, returned to a life of crime.

Weather Wizard joined up with Blacksmith and her rogues. Through her, he learns he has a son from a one-night stand with Keystone City police officer Julie Jackham. Their son, Josh, had exhibited internalized weather-controlling abilities and Mardon wanted to have the same ability without the use of his wand. He tried to kidnap Josh from Wally's wife, Linda and dissect him to understand out how his son gained that ability, but hesitated to harm the child when he noticed that the child had "my eyes...my brother's eyes". He was stopped by Flash and sent to Iron Heights, but escaped. After Blacksmith's group disbanded, the Weather Wizard, along with Mirror Master and Trickster, joined up with Captain Cold, who declared himself the leader of the Rogues. Mardon was also the representative of the rogues for the Secret Society of Super Villains.

One Year Later
One Year Later, he and several other Rogues are approached by Inertia with a plan to kill the Flash (then Bart Allen). Inertia destroyed Weather Wizard's wand and used 30th century psychological therapies to remove the mental blocks which prevented him from using his powers without it. Though Inertia is eventually defeated, the other Rogues beat Bart to death, Weather Wizard using his control over lightning to electrocute him. After Allen's identity was revealed, Mardon was surprised and horrified to discover that the Rogues had "killed a kid".

Salvation Run
Weather Wizard is one of the exiled villains featured in Salvation Run along with his fellow Rogues: Captain Cold, Heat Wave, Mirror Master, and Abra Kadabra.

Final Crisis: Rogues' Revenge
He was seen as the member of Rogues who joined Libra's Secret Society of Super Villains. In the Final Crisis: Rogues' Revenge series, however, Weather Wizard and the rest of the Rogues reject Libra's offer, wanting to stay out of the game (Captain Cold even berates Mirror Master for working with scum like Dr. Light). Before they can retire, they hear of Inertia escaping and decide to stick around long enough to get revenge for being used. In retaliation, Libra kidnaps Josh and tries to get Mardon to join the Society, threatening to kill the boy if he does not, to which Mardon responds: "If I killed my brother, Libra, if I electrocuted the only person who ever cared about me, what makes you think I care anything about that child?" Libra then taunts Mardon to prove him wrong. Mardon is hesitant to make a move when Inertia kills the boy himself, and Mardon joins his fellow Rogues in defeating and killing Inertia.

The Flash (Vol. 3)
Weather Wizard and the Rogues visit Sam Scudder's old hideout and unveil a giant mirror with the words In Case of Flash: Break Glass written on it. Afterward, Mardon is still on the run with the Rogues.

The New 52
In The New 52 timeline, while Weather Wizard's past with Barry Allen remains almost unchanged, his origins are slightly different. Now called Marco Mardon he and his brother, Claudio, are Latino and the heads of an organized crime family. After their father's death Marco runs away, eventually becoming the Weather Wizard, but is called back after Claudio's murder. The Flash, looking for Patty Spivot who had been kidnapped, later attacks and submits Mardon forcing Elsa, his brother's widow, to reveal she was the kidnapper and also Claudio's killer. This revelation drives Marco to the edge, making him attempt a suicide-murder by calling lightning to strike himself and Elsa, but he survives and is approached by the Golden Glider for an unknown plot.

In the Watchmen sequel Doomsday Clock, Weather Wizard and his fellow Rogues are among the villain that attend the underground meeting held by Riddler that talks about the Superman Theory.

Powers, abilities, and equipment
Weather Wizard originally wields a wand that enables him to control weather patterns. Mark has utilized it to project blizzards, summon lightning bolts, fly via air currents, create fog, and generate winds. Essentially, he could produce any type of weather imaginable, as well as other phenomenon, such as tornadoes. Thanks to Inertia's 30th century psychological therapies, his mental blocks were permanently removed. Weather Wizard can now manipulate the weather without his wand.

In The New 52 reality, Marco Mardon returns to utilize his weather wand, but reveals that the device drove him crazy.

Other versions

Earth-33
A version of Weather Wizard exists on Earth-33, a world of magicians.

New Rogues
The New Rogues version of Weather Wizard is Weather Witch, an unknown woman and former prostitute from Gotham City who possesses the Weather Wand.

Flashpoint
In the alternate timeline of the Flashpoint event, Weather Wizard was imprisoned in Iron Heights. Weather Wizard is then confronted by Mirror Master, who assembles the Rogues. Weather Wizard then escaped from Iron Heights and pursued revenge against Citizen Cold for murdering his brother, Clyde. Citizen Cold killed Weather Wizard revealing that his brother, Clyde hired Citizen Cold to kill him, but Citizen Cold also tells him that to do it for free.

Captain Carrot and His Amazing Zoo Crew
The 1980s series Captain Carrot and His Amazing Zoo Crew presented the parallel Earth of "Earth-C-Minus", a world populated by talking animal superheroes that paralleled the mainstream DC Universe. Earth-C-Minus features the villainous "Weather Weasel", a weasel counterpart of the Weather Wizard, who battles his nemesis, the hero known as the Crash.

25th Century Weather Wizard
A futuristic version Weather Warlock is a heroic Weather Wizard as part of the 25th Century cops known as the Renegades from Professor Zoom's future.

In other media

Television

 Weather Wizard appears in Legends of the Superheroes, portrayed by Jeff Altman. This version is a member of the Legion of Doom.
 The writers of The Flash (1990), Danny Bilson and Paul DeMeo, attempted to use Weather Wizard, but did not have enough money to do so and had to wait until they had a larger budget. Ultimately however, the plan failed to materialize after the show was canceled.
 A character based on Weather Wizard called Dr. Eno / Weatherman appears in Justice League of America, portrayed by Miguel Ferrer.
 Weather Wizard appears in the Superman: The Animated Series episode "Speed Demons", voiced by Miguel Ferrer. This version is a former extortionist from Central City who tracks Superman and Flash's coordinates and siphons their energy through arm bands to power his weather-manipulating machinery while they are competing for the title of the "fastest man alive". However, the heroes discover Mark's plans and defeat him with help from Mark's brother, Ben Mardon.
 Weather Wizard appears in the Justice League two-part episode "Hereafter", voiced by Corey Burton. He joins the Superman Revenge Squad to pursue their eponymous goal. However, while fighting the Justice League, he is disarmed and knocked out by Batman.
 Weather Wizard appears in Justice League Unlimited, voiced again by Corey Burton. As of the episode "I Am Legion", he has joined Gorilla Grodd's Secret Society. Prior to and during the episode "Alive!", Lex Luthor gains control of the Society, but Grodd mounts a mutiny. Weather Wizard sides with the latter, but ends up frozen by Killer Frost and killed by Darkseid along with Grodd's other loyalists.
 Weather Wizard appears in Batman: The Brave and the Bold, voiced by Robin Atkin Downes. This version is a member of the Rogues and the Legion of Doom.
 Weather Wizard appears in Robot Chicken DC Comics Special 2: Villains in Paradise, voiced by Matthew Senreich. This version is a member of the Legion of Doom.
 Clyde and Mark Mardon appear in The Flash, portrayed by Chad Rook and Liam McIntyre, respectively. Introduced in the series pilot, these versions are bank robbers who were caught in a plane crash when S.T.A.R. Labs' particle accelerator exploded, giving them both the ability to manipulate the weather. Additionally, Clyde and Mark are the uncle and father of Joslyn "Joss" Jackam / Weather Witch respectively. After Clyde is killed by CCPD Detective Joe West, Mark attempts to seek revenge, facing the Flash on several occasions along the way.

Film
Weather Wizard appears in the DC Animated Movie Universe series of films.
 He first appears in the opening for Justice League vs. Teen Titans, voiced by Rick D. Wasserman. This version is a member of the Legion of Doom. The Legionnaires fight the Flash, who defeats them. Weather Wizard tries to run away, but is possessed by Trigon, who makes him powerful enough to rival the Justice League without his wand. Despite this, he is stopped by Damian Wayne and Wonder Woman, who exorcise the demon out of him.
 Weather Wizard makes a non-speaking appearance in Justice League Dark: Apokolips War.

Video games
 Weather Wizard appears in Batman: The Brave and the Bold – The Videogame, voiced again by Corey Burton.
 Weather Wizard appears in DC Universe Online, voiced by Brandon Young.

Miscellaneous
 A second Weather Wizard resembling the mainstream incarnation appears in issue #38 of the Justice League Unlimited tie-in comic book. This unnamed Weather Wizard unsuccessfully attempts to defeat the Flash and Wonder Woman with help from Giganta, the Top, and the Mirror Master.
 Weather Wizard appears in the Injustice: Gods Among Us prequel comic as a member of the Rogues, who are recruited into Batman's Insurgency to cripple Superman's Regime. While destroying Regime bases, the Rogues are attacked by Bizarro, who kills Weather Wizard and Heat Wave.

References

External links
 Weather Wizard at Comic Vine

Characters created by Carmine Infantino
Characters created by John Broome
Comics characters introduced in 1959
DC Comics metahumans
DC Comics scientists
Fictional murderers
DC Comics supervillains
DC Comics television characters
Fictional characters with electric or magnetic abilities
Fictional characters with weather abilities
Flash (comics) characters